Novopetrovsky (masculine), Novopetrovskaya (feminine), or Novopetrovskoye (neuter) may refer to:

Novopetrovskoye, name of the town of Fort-Shevchenko, Kazakhstan before 1857
Novopetrovskoye, Republic of Bashkortostan, a village (selo) in the Republic of Bashkortostan, Russia
Novopetrovskoye, name of several other rural localities in Russia

See also
Novopetrovka
Novopetrovsk (disambiguation)
Petrovsky (disambiguation)